The Light is a science fiction short story by Poul Anderson.  It was first published in Galaxy Science Fiction magazine in March, 1957.  The plot concerns the crew of a spaceship from the USA landing on the Moon during a period of intense Cold War tension, and the possibly disastrous consequences of their discovery there.

The story is framed as the account of an unnamed narrator telling a professor of art history about their upcoming secret mission, and why it is so critical.  Besides his skills in science and mathematics, the narrator is also interested in the art of the Old Masters.

Plot
The narrator tells how he and two others, Baird, the commander, and Hernandez, the engineer, flew the spaceship Benjamin Franklin to the Moon, landing just outside the crater Plato.  The Soviet Union has already placed a space station in orbit and may have already secretly landed on the Moon.

After completing routine exploration and sampling, the crew decide to trek up the crater wall of Plato. When they reach a point where they can see into the crater, they notice some out-gassing taking place below them.  The narrator wants to climb down and investigate the cloud of vapor, but Baird, who does not trust him, opposes this until Hernandez intervenes.  Climbing down, they find themselves on a flat ledge under the vapor cloud, with the sunlight acting on the cloud to produce a light that the narrator finds strangely familiar.  Then to their shock, they find footprints, but not those of a space suit.  Instead, they seem to have been made by hobnailed boots.  Baird insists on returning to the ship to report this, but the narrator wants to follow the prints back to their source.  Eventually he goes alone down to the crater floor and finds traces of a camp, the tracks of some kind of vehicle, but no trace of a rocket.  Finally he notices the shape of the Holy Cross etched into a rock.  Barely making it back to the ship before his suit's power and air run out, the narrator says he knows who was there before them.

Believing that the previous explorer must have had access to some revolutionary technology, technology that could win or start a war, the narrator reveals to the professor that the light he saw on the ledge was the same as that used in the painting Virgin of the Rocks, and that their mission is search museums and old papers to find some clue as to how Leonardo da Vinci could have walked on the Moon.

External links

1957 short stories
Science fiction short stories
Works by Poul Anderson